"Boyfriend" is a song by Alphabeat. A new version, produced by Mike Spencer, was released as their third UK single. Radio 1 put the song on their A List. The song was inspired by a Swedish film that depicted a teenage, lesbian romance.

Music videos
There have so far been two music video versions. A Danish one, directed by Daniel Eskils features the band performing and having their instruments drawn on the wall.

A second video was released in the UK and involves the group performing in front of tape recorders, while Anders SG becomes wrapped up by the tapes.

Track listings
CD single
 Boyfriend
 Black & Gold (Radio 1 Live Lounge session)

iTunes exclusive vingle
 Boyfriend
 Boyfriend (Live @ Koko)
 A Message
 Boyfriend (video)

Standard mixes bundle
 Boyfriend
 Boyfriend Alex Metric Mix
 Boyfriend Bloody Beetroot Mix
 Boyfriend Dave Spoon Remix
 Boyfriend Caged Baby Remix
 Boyfriend Pete Hammond Mix (radio edit)
 Boyfriend WaWa Remix (radio edit)

Charts

References

2007 singles
2007 songs
Alphabeat songs
Copenhagen Records singles